Mexican Hat is a census-designated place (CDP) in Utah in the United States. It is on the San Juan River on the northern edge of the Navajo Nation's borders in south-central San Juan County. The population was 31 in the 2010 census, a sharp decline from the previous two censuses.

History

The "Hat" has two rock climbing routes ascending it. Mexican Hat has frequently been noted on lists of unusual place names.

In 2016, the U.S. Route 163 bridge crossing the San Juan River on the south border of the town was renamed the "Jason R. Workman Memorial Bridge" after a member of SEAL Team Six who was killed in action in Afghanistan on August 6, 2011. Workman was a 1997 graduate of the nearby San Juan High School.

Geography

Climate
According to the Köppen Climate Classification system, Mexican Hat has a semi-arid climate, abbreviated "BSk" on climate maps.

Demographics

As of the census of 2010, there were 31 people in 17 households residing in the CDP. The population density was 3.8 people per square mile (1.5/km2). There were 23 housing units at an average density of 2.8/sq mi (1.1/km2). The racial make-up of the CDP was 9.7% Native American and 90.3% White.

There were 17 households, out of which 5.9% had children under the age of 18 living with them, 29.4% were married couples living together, 17.6% had a female householder with no husband present, and 47.1% were non-families. 64.7% of all households were made up of individuals, and 5.9% had someone living alone who was 65 years of age or older. The average household size was 1.82 and the average family size was 2.56.

In the CDP, the population skewed older since the last census, with 6.4% under the age of 15, zero residents aged 15 to 24, 25.8% from 25 to 44, 25.9% from 45 to 64, and 42% who were 65 years of age or older. The median age was 54.5 years.

As of 2012, the median income for a household in the CDP was $80,767, and there were no families or individuals living below the poverty line.

See also

 List of census-designated places in Utah

References

External links

 Mexican Hat photo gallery
 Valley of the Gods

Census-designated places in San Juan County, Utah
Census-designated places in Utah